Wendell is a town in Franklin County, Massachusetts, United States. The population was 924 at the 2020 census. It is part of the Springfield, Massachusetts Metropolitan Statistical Area.

History 
Wendell was first settled in 1754 and was officially incorporated in 1781. It was named after Judge Oliver Wendell of Boston.  The town center has been listed as a historic district on the National Register of Historic Places.

The tornado knocked down trees, including an old maple tree, whose falling damaged gravestones in a historic cemetery in Wendell Center. While trees were downed and some structures damaged, no one was injured.

Geography

The town has two post offices. One (zip code 01379) is located approximately one mile south of the town center on Lockes Village Road, the other is listed as "Wendell Depot" (zip code 01380)—near the location of the old train station in the days of passenger rail—and the town is often listed as such on maps.

Wendell State Forest

Located south of the Millers River, Wendell State Forest covers 7,566 acres of rolling forested hills, streams, ponds, and trails. Purchased in the 1920s the area had been heavily burned during the early 1900s. Some of the park development and most of the road systems are attributed to Civilian Conservation Corps activities in the 1930s. Ruggles Pond is the main day-use area. This 10 acre pond offers crystal clear water for swimming and fishing. Picnic sites and a ball field with a pavilion are located nearby. There is a small boat launching ramp located at the Northern end of Wickett Pond. The Metacomet-Monadnock Trail traverses the forest boundaries and offers a small Adirondack shelter for trail users.

Education

Wendell students attend elementary school at Swift River Elementary School in New Salem for K–6. High school students attend Ralph C. Mahar Regional High School in Orange for 7–12.

Demographics

As of the census of 2000, there were 986 people, 378 households, and 224 families residing in the town. There were 439 housing units at an average density of 13.7 per square mile (5.3/km). The racial makeup of the town was 92.49% White, 3.45% African American, 0.41% Asian, 1.32% from other races, and 2.33% from two or more races. Hispanic or Latino of any race were 1.42% of the population.

There were 378 households, out of which 27.0% had children under the age of 18 living with them, 43.7% were married couples living together, 10.6% had a female householder with no husband present, and 40.5% were non-families. Of all households 28.6% were made up of individuals, and 3.7% had someone living alone who was 65 years of age or older.  The average household size was 2.35 and the average family size was 2.88.

In the town, the population was spread out, with 25.7% under the age of 18, 7.3% from 18 to 24, 30.6% from 25 to 44, 31.8% from 45 to 64, and 4.6% who were 65 years of age or older.  The median age was 38 years. For every 100 females, there were 106.7 males.  For every 100 females age 18 and over, there were 102.5 males.

The median income for a household in the town was $43,846, and the median income for a family was $60,147. Males had a median income of $32,639 versus $27,375 for females. The per capita income for the town was $19,701.  About 5.8% of families and 10.2% of the population were below the poverty line, including 8.2% of those under age 18 and 17.6% of those age 65 or over.

Politics
The town provided Green Party nominee Jill Stein with her largest percentage of the vote statewide in the 2016 presidential election. Out of 584 total votes cast in the town, Stein received 48 (8.22 percent, more than five times of her statewide percentage of 1.43).  Democrat Hillary Rodham Clinton won the town with 402 votes (68.84 percent) over Republican Donald J. Trump, who received 104 votes (17.81 percent). Libertarian Gary Johnson received 21 votes (3.60 percent) and there were nine write-ins (1.54 percent).

References

External links

 Town of Wendell official website

Springfield metropolitan area, Massachusetts
Towns in Franklin County, Massachusetts
Towns in Massachusetts